The Ishida Opening (石田流三間飛車 ishida-ryū sankenbisha or shorter form 石田流 ishida-ryū) is a major variation in Third File Rook openings of the Japanese game of shōgi.

In the Ishida Opening, in contrast to other Third File Rook openings, the seventh file pawn is advanced to the fifth rank if played by Black (P-75), or the third file pawn if played by White (P-35). This allows the rook to move up to the 76 square (Black) or 34 square (White).

History

The variation is said to have originated with a blind shōgi player named Kengyo Ishida in the early  Edo period. Although records of Ishida's actual games still exist, all of them end in Ishida's loss. An extant game record of a Double Ranging Rook game in 1649 featuring an Ishida position played by Kengyo Ishida is shown in the diagram.

A renaissance of the Ishida variation occurred in the 1970s through the development of an original strategy by the well-known shōgi master Kōzō Masuda, in what is now called Masuda's Ishida (升田式石田流 Masuda-shiki Ishida-ryū). Further developments occurred in the 2000s with professional player Daisuke Suzuki creating the New Quick Ishida variation in 2004, Kenji Imaizumi developing the 1... R-32 opening in 2007, and Toshiaki Kubo adding new moves in 2008. These strategies have attracted renewed interest among professional players since 2011.

Development

The Ishida variation of Third File Rook uses a particular piece formation not found in other Third File Rook openings. In this structure, an early bishop exchange is prevented. It is therefore known as a slow game (持久戦 jikyūsen).

This contrasts with the Quick Ishida (haya ishida) where the possibility of a bishop exchange remains throughout the opening – a rapid attack game (急戦 kyūsen). When referring specifically to the slow Ishida variant, the term 石田流本組 ishida-ryū hongumi is used in Japanese, which is translated as Real Ishida by Fairbairn and Ishida Plenary Formation by Kawasaki (Kitao 2011). Hosking refers to this simply as the Ishida, while the fast game is called the Ishida Quick Attack.

With the rook at 76 (or at 34 for White), the knight will be placed behind the rook to help build up the position. The bishop usually moves to the edge from its starting position, as shown in the diagram, while the left silver is often brought to the center.

Said to be the ideal formation for Ranging Rook, it appears also in cases where the rook does not move to the third file from the start (as in Fourth File Rook or Twisting Rook). The Ishida Opening is also considered the ideal formation in a game with a Lance handicap.

The Ishida is also popular as a potent countermeasure against Static Rook Anaguma due to the versatility of its attack, with the left gold moving to 78 to improve the build up and to reinforce the weak points created by attacking from the seventh file.

See also
 Quick Ishida
 Third File Rook
 Ranging Rook

References

Bibliography
 
 
 
 
  - 1995年のものの加筆・文庫版

External links
 Lectures on the Latest Strategies: Lecture 7: Ishida
 Shogi Opening: 
 3rd File Rook: Plenary Ishida Style vs Climbing Gold (Not Exchange Bishop Type)
 3rd File Rook: Plenary Ishida Style vs Left Mino
 Yet Another Shogi Site: Gote Ishida Style (Countermeasures)
 Shogi Planet (Evernote documents):
 3rd File · Ishida N-77 variation
 3rd File · Ishida B-77 variation
 3rd File · Ishida vs Climbing Gold variation
 Ishida At A Glance
 コンピュータ将棋研究Blog: 最強の証明―石田流本組み破りponanza流☖６三金型 · the Ponanza computer shogi engine's Counter-Ishida Static Rook variation

Shogi openings
Ranging Rook openings
Third File Rook openings